Los Pinos Airstrip is a paved airstrip located South of San Quintín, Municipality of Ensenada, Baja California, Mexico, just on the East side of the Federal Highway 1, to the East of "Hotel Santa Maria" and Cielito Lindo Airstrip. The Flying Samaritans' Mother Lode and Tucson chapters operate a monthly fly-in clinic here and in El Rosario to the south. The airstrip is used solely for general aviation  purposes.

External links
Baja Bush Pilots forum about San Quintín airstrips
Baja Bush Pilots topic about Rancho Los Pinos Airstrip.

Airports in Baja California